Robin K. Brown (born April 22, 1961) is a Minnesota politician and a former member of the Minnesota House of Representatives (2007-2011) A member of the Minnesota Democratic-Farmer-Labor Party (DFL), she represented District 27A, which includes all or portions of Freeborn and Mower counties in the southeastern part of the state.

Early life, education, and career
Brown was raised on a farm and was the oldest of eight children.  She graduated from Montezuma High School in Montezuma, Iowa, attended Lycoming College in Williamsport, PA and then went on to Minnesota State University, Mankato in Mankato, receiving her B.A. in Art Education. In 2006, she earned her M.A. in Education from St. Mary's University in Winona.
Brown is an art and photography teacher at Albert Lea High School in Albert Lea.  She is also a Horse Breeder.  She is Owner and Operator of Wedgewood Peruvian Pasos.

Minnesota House of Representatives

Elections
Brown was first elected in 2006, and was re-elected in 2008. She was unseated by Republican Rich Murray in her 2010 re-election bid, losing by a mere 57 votes after an election recount.

Tenure
She was a member of the House Commerce and Labor Subcommittee for the Telecommunications Regulation and Infrastructure Division, and of the Finance subcommittees for the Agriculture, Rural Economies and Veterans Affairs Finance Division, the Cultural and Outdoor Resources Finance Division, and the K-12 Education Finance Division.

Personal life
Brown resides in Moscow Township, Minnesota.
Her husband, Joseph "Joe" Brown is a former Iowa State Senator who represented the old 27th and 35th districts in that state from 1979-1987.
Brown has 6 children (3 from a previous marriage): Nathaniel, Crystal, Earnest, Jeb, Bristen, and Madison.
In her spare time, Brown enjoys horseback riding and painting.

References

External links 

 Rep. Brown Web Page
 Project Votesmart - Rep. Robin Brown Profile
 Minnesota Public Radio Votetracker: Rep. Robin Brown
 Session Weekly 1/19/2007: "One on one: Art teacher looks to paint good picture for constituents"

1961 births
Living people
People from Freeborn County, Minnesota
Democratic Party members of the Minnesota House of Representatives
Lycoming College alumni
Minnesota State University, Mankato alumni
Saint Mary's University of Minnesota alumni
Women state legislators in Minnesota
People from Montezuma, Iowa
21st-century American politicians
21st-century American women politicians